Brian Gowins (born June 3, 1976) is a former American football placekicker who played eight seasons in the Arena Football League with the Grand Rapids Rampage, Las Vegas Gladiators and Orlando Predators. He played college football at Northwestern University and attended Shades Valley High School in Irondale, Alabama. He was also a member of the Chicago Bears of the National Football League.

References

External links
Just Sports Stats
College stats
Brian Gowins' days with Rampage are over, but kicker landed role in 'Red Dawn'

Living people
1976 births
Players of American football from Birmingham, Alabama
American football placekickers
Northwestern Wildcats football players
Chicago Bears players
Grand Rapids Rampage players
Las Vegas Gladiators players
Orlando Predators players
People from Irondale, Alabama